Short I with tail (Ҋ ҋ; italics: Ҋ ҋ) is a letter of the Cyrillic script. Its form is derived from the Cyrillic letter Short I (Й й) by adding a tail to the right leg.

Short I with tail is used only in the alphabet of the Kildin Sami language to represent the voiceless palatal approximant ; the Cyrillic letter Je (Ј ј) may also be used.

Computing codes

See also
И и : Cyrillic letter I
Cyrillic characters in Unicode

Cyrillic letters with diacritics
Letters with hook